Diplograptidae is an extinct family of graptolites.

Genera
List of genera from Maletz (2014):

Subfamily Diplograptinae
†Apiograptus Cooper & McLaurin, 1974
†Archiclimacograptus Mitchell, 1987
†Diplograpsis M’Coy, 1850
†Eoglyptograptus Mitchell, 1987
†Exigraptus Mu, 1979 in Mu et al. (1979)
†Fenhshiangograptus Hong, 1957
†Levisograptus Maletz 2011
†Mesograptus Elles & Wood, 1907
†Oepikograptus Obut, 1987
†Prorectograptus Li, 1994
†Pseudamplexograptus Mitchell, 1987
†Urbanekograptus Mitchell, 1987

Subfamily Orthograptinae
†Amplexograptus Elles & Wood, 1907
†Anticostia Stewart & Mitchell, 1997
†Arnheimograptus Mitchell, 1987
†Ceramograptus Hudson, 1915
†Geniculograptus Mitchell, 1987
†Hustedograptus Mitchell, 1987
†Orthograptus Lapworth, 1873
†Orthoretiograptus Mu, 1977 in Wang & Jin (1977)
†Pacificograptus Koren’, 1979
†Paraorthograptus Mu et al., 1974
†Pararetiograptus Mu et al., 1974
†Peiragraptus Strachan, 1954
†Pseudoreteograptus Mu, 1993 in Mu et al. (1993)
†Rectograptus Přibyl, 1949
†Uticagraptus Riva, 1987

References

Graptolites
Prehistoric hemichordate families